Jonathan Joseph Freudman Quintana (born June 8, 1990) is a Venezuelan actor.

Filmography

References

External links
 

1990 births
21st-century Venezuelan male actors
Living people
Venezuelan male television actors